Cromer is a railway station in the English county of Norfolk. Because the Midland and Great Northern Joint Railway (M&GNJR) line approached Cromer from the west, following the coastal clifftops, it avoided the steep escarpment which had prevented the earlier line from Norwich running all the way into the town. Consequently, it became possible to build a far more conveniently located station, near to the town centre and the beach. The station opened as Cromer Beach on 16 June 1887 and was renamed Cromer on 20 October 1969, following the closure of Cromer High station in 1954.
Cromer is one of only two former Midland and Great Northern Joint Railway stations to remain operational on the National Rail network; the other being the neighbouring West Runton. Sheringham and Weybourne are the other two surviving M&GNJR stations, both still served today on the heritage North Norfolk Railway.

Buildings 
To cater to the heavy leisure traffic at the end of the 19th century, Cromer Beach had a large station building in a half-timbered style, and a large goods yard. The station originally included a bar, which was closed in 1966. Following the introduction of conductor-guard working, the ticket facilities were no longer needed and the building fell into disuse; it was renovated and reopened as a public house in 1998. A large supermarket was built on the site of the goods yards in 1991.

Services 
The station is served by local services operated by Greater Anglia on the Bittern Line from Norwich to Sheringham.

Trains run hourly between Norwich and Sheringham. On weekdays the first train of the day to Norwich starts at Cromer (all other up trains start at Sheringham). 
There are fewer services on Sundays, which alternate every hour between a stopping service (calling at all stations) and a semi-fast service that only calls at North Walsham and Hoveton & Wroxham. All of these services are run by bi-mode Class 755 units.

In 1997 a single daily through train to and from London Liverpool Street to Sheringham via Cromer was introduced; it was not heavily used and the service was consequently discontinued.

Because of its historical position as the terminus of the line from Melton Constable and Sheringham to the west, trains running via Cromer reverse direction on leaving the station.

The following services currently call at Cromer:

See also
 Railway stations in Cromer

References

External links
 Cromer's railway stations on navigable 1946 O. S. map

Railway stations in Norfolk
Former Midland and Great Northern Joint Railway stations
Railway stations in Great Britain opened in 1887
Greater Anglia franchise railway stations
DfT Category F1 stations
Cromer